On Probation (: "A Time for the Brave") is a 2005 Argentine crime comedy film written and directed by Damián Szifrón and starring Diego Peretti and Luis Luque. Contributing writers for the film were Agustín Rolandelli and Nicolás Smudt. It was produced by Oscar Kramer and Hugo Sigman.

The film is considered an Argentine entry in the buddy-cop adventure subgenre.

Synopsis
Alfredo Díaz (Luis Luque) is a cop who falls into a depression after discovering that his wife has been cheating on him. Mariano Silverstein (Diego Peretti), a psychologist assigned by the force, tries to help Alfredo deal with his problem.

When Alfredo is invited to dinner to Silverstein's home, he unmasks Silverstein's wife, who also has an affair, which causes the psychologist and the cop to switch roles. Díaz takes Silverstein with him on many adventures as both begin to unravel a criminal conspiracy of national proportions.

Cast
 Luis Luque as Inspector Alfredo Díaz
 Diego Peretti as Licenciado Mariano Silverstein
 Martín Adjemián as Comisario
 Ernesto Claudio as Lomianto
 Oscar Ferreiro as Lebonian
 Gabriela Iscovich as Diana
 Tony Lestingi as Arias
 Dulio Orso as Radamés
 Carlos Portaluppi as Villegas
 Hilario Quinteros as Alfredo Gauto
 Marcelo Sein as Farina
 Daniel Valenzuela as Pontrémoli

Distribution
The film opened wide in Argentina on September 29, 2005.

It was shown at film festivals, including: the Málaga Film Festival, Spain; the Indie - World Film Festival, Brazil; the Villeurbanne Festival Reflets du cinéma ibérique et Latino-américain, France; and others.

Critical reception
Variety magazine film critic Jonathan Holland,  liked the film although he had a few problems with the latter part of the film.  He wrote, "A well-scripted and played Argentine buddy movie that generates fine comedy and decent thrills from an engagingly offbeat premise, On Probation is a surprising pleasure. Though things fall apart somewhat in the final reels, the solid work early on sees pic through successfully. Probation did good business at home following its September 2005 release, followed by unexpectedly healthy Spanish B.O. in 2006, suggesting pic could walk free in selected offshore markets beyond the Hispanic, with a cult following via fest play likely."

Awards
Wins
 Málaga Spanish Film Festival, Málaga, Spain: Silver Biznaga; Best Latin American Actor, Luis Luque; 2006.
 Peñíscola Comedy Film Festival, Peñíscola, Spain: Best Actor, Diego Peretti; Best Director, Damián Szifron; Best Film, Damián Szifron; 2006.
 Biarritz International Festival of Latin American Cinema, Biarritz, France: Audience Award, Damián Szifron; 2006.

Nominations
 Argentine Film Critics Association Awards:  Best Actor, Luis Luque; Best Actor, Diego Peretti; Best Cinematography, Lucio Bonelli; Best Director, Damián Szifron; Best Editing, Alberto Ponce; Best Film; Best Music, Guillermo Guareschi; Best Original Screenplay, Damián Szifron, Agustín Rolandelli, and Nicolás Smudt; Best Sound, Fernando Soldevila; 2006.

References

External links
  Official Website
 
 Tiempo de valientes at cinenacional.com 
 Tiempo de valientes review by Diego Batlle La Nación 
 Tiempo de valientes film trailer YouTube

2005 films
2000s crime comedy films
Argentine independent films
2000s Spanish-language films
Films shot in Buenos Aires
2000s buddy comedy films
2000s buddy cop films
Argentine crime comedy films
2005 comedy films
2005 independent films
2000s Argentine films